Continuum: Journal of Media & Cultural Studies is a peer-reviewed academic journal affiliated with the Cultural Studies Association of Australasia. It was established in 1987 by Thomas O'Regan and Brian Shoesmith. It is edited by Panizza Allmark (Senior/Chief Editor), John Tebbutt and Timothy Laurie. The journal is published by Taylor & Francis.

Abstracting and indexing 
The journal is abstracted and indexed in the International Bibliography of the Social Sciences.

External links 
 
 Cultural Studies Association of Australasia

Taylor & Francis academic journals
English-language journals
Cultural journals
Publications established in 1988
Bimonthly journals